Dalbert is a name. It may refer to:

 Suzanne Dalbert (1927–1970), French actress
 Dalbert (footballer) (Dalbert Henrique Chagas Estevão, born 1993), Brazilian football left-back